Spiramater lutra, the otter spiramater, is a species of cutworm or dart moth in the family Noctuidae. It is found in North America.

The MONA or Hodges number for Spiramater lutra is 10301.

References

Further reading

 
 
 

Hadenini
Articles created by Qbugbot
Moths described in 1852